Toras Chaim (Hebrew: תורת חיים) is a two-volume work of Hasidic discourses on the books of Genesis and Exodus by the second Chabad Rebbe, Rabbi Dovber Schneuri. The work is arranged in a similar fashion as Likutei Torah/Torah Or, a fundamental work on Chabad philosophy authored by Rabbi Dovber's father, Rabbi Shneur Zalman of Liadi, the founder of the Chabad movement. Both works are arranged according to the weekly Torah portion.

The treatises in Toras Chaim are noted for their length and complexity, as well as their elucidation of concepts discussed in Likutei Torah/Torah Or.

Teachings

Humor 
 "Laughter is rooted in the soul’s potential for pure and uncompounded pleasure."
 "Within the soul, the source of humor is higher than intellect, for the pleasure derived from intellect is compounded."

Elucidation of Tanya and Torah Or
The seventh Chabad Rebbe, Rabbi Menachem Mendel Schneerson, recommended the study of Torah Or and Toras Chaim after one completed the study of Tanya, the central text of Chabad philosophy. Rabbi Schneerson explained that Torah Or expanded on the ideas in Tanya, however, through studying Toras Chaim these concepts would be fully elucidated.

Published editions
Toras Chaim was published slowly over the course of many years. The various editions slowly expanded the multi-volume work until it had included Hasidic treatises covering the first two books of the Bible, Genesis and Exodus.

Kapust
The first printing of Toras Chaim occurred during Rabbi Dovber's lifetime; it was printed in Kapust, 1826. The Kapust edition contained Hasidic treatises covering just the first half of the book of Genesis.

Warsaw

The next edition of Toras Chaim was published in Warsaw, in 1866. The edition was published by Rafael Mordechai Schneerson, the great-nephew of Rabbi Dovber Schneuri, together with Schneur Schneerson, a grandson of Rabbi Dovber. This edition included treatises covering the second half of the book of Genesis.

Shanghai
In 1946, the Chabad yeshiva in Shanghai and the central Chabad publishing house, Kehot Publication Society, republished the Warsaw edition of Toras Chaim. Additionally, a series of unpublished Hasidic treatises by Rabbi Dovber covering the book of Exodus were included in a separate second volume. The edition was published. The second volume was never typeset. Instead, those treatises remained a photocopy of the original handwritten transcripts.

Brooklyn
The central Chabad publishing house in Brooklyn, Kehot Publication Society, republished Toras Chaim in 1974, 1993 and 2004. The 2004 edition is a 1,812 page, three-volume set; the Exodus treatises have been typeset and all treatises include extensive footnotes and annotations.

References

External links
Toras Chaim on ChabadLibrary.org

1826 non-fiction books
Chabad-Lubavitch texts
Chabad-Lubavitch (Hasidic dynasty)
Hasidic literature
Jewish philosophical literature
Sifrei Kodesh
Book of Genesis
Book of Exodus